Tommy Dix (born Bobby Paine Brittain Navard; December 6, 1923) is an American former baritone singer and actor. He started performing at the age of 11 in 1935. He attended Juilliard School at the age of 15.

Dix appeared in the Broadway musical The Corn Is Green, which ran from 1941 to 1942. He had the male lead in Best Foot Forward (1943). He played the young cadet Bud Hooper opposite Lucille Ball. He sang several songs in it. He had previously played Chuck Green in the 1941 Broadway musical of the same name. He sang regularly at various clubs, including the Stage Door Canteen. He decided to retire from show business in the late 1940s. He attended the University of Alabama, majoring in architectural engineering. He worked in real estate and construction.

Personal life
Dix was married to Margaret Ann Grayson in Alabama. They later divorced. He served in the Army during World War II.

References

External links

1923 births
Living people
American male film actors
American male singers